In basketball, an assist is a pass to a teammate that directly leads to a score by field goal. The VTB United League's assists title is awarded to the player with the highest assists per game average in a given regular season.

Assists leaders

References

External links
 VTB United League Official Website 
 VTB United League Official Website 

VTB United League statistical leaders